Nigel Gray Leakey VC (1 January 1913 – 19 May 1941) was a British soldier and a recipient of the Victoria Cross, the highest award for gallantry in the face of the enemy that can be awarded to British and Commonwealth forces.

Early life
Leakey was born in Kiganjo, Kenya to English parents. Leakey's mother Elizabeth died in 1926. His father, Arundell Gray Leakey, was the son of Reverend John Arundell Leakey, clergyman in England. He was a cousin of archaeologists Louis Leakey and Richard Leakey. Leakey's younger brother Rea Leakey served in the Royal Tank Regiment in the Second World War, and became a major general. His sister Agnes Leakey (later Agnes Hofmeyr) worked for black and white reconciliation in Kenya.

His father was an honorary Kikuyu tribesman known as "Morungaru" ("tall and straight"); he was kidnapped and brutally murdered by the Mau Mau in October 1954, and his second wife Mary was also killed.

Leakey was educated in Kenya, and then attended Bromsgrove School in England. Returning to Kenya, at the outbreak of war in 1939 he joined the Kenya Regiment and, after training, was attached to the King's African Rifles.

Victoria Cross
Leakey was a 28 years old sergeant in the 1/6th Battalion, King's African Rifles during the Second World War when the following deed took place for which he was awarded the Victoria Cross. Leakey's 1/6th Battalion was part of the 22nd (East African) Brigade (12th African Division).

On 19 May 1941, at Kolito, Abyssinia (now Ethiopia), when the Allied forces had made a bridgehead against the strong Italian opposition, the enemy made a sudden counterattack with both light and medium tanks. In the face of withering fire, Sergeant Leakey leaped on top of one of the tanks, wrenched open the turret and shot all the crew except the driver, whom he forced to drive the tank to cover. Along with three others, he tried to repeat this with another tank, but just as he opened the turret, he was killed. The confusion and loss of armour Leakey caused was critical to the Italian defeat in the battle. Captain David Hines witnessed the event through binoculars, as did other soldiers.

Leakey has no known grave but he is commemorated on the East Africa Memorial, near Nairobi, Kenya.

His second cousin twice removed, Joshua Leakey, was also awarded the Victoria Cross for his service in Afghanistan in 2013.

Leakey's medal is kept by a member of the Leakey family in England.

See also
 East African Campaign (World War II)
 Leakey family

References

1913 births
1941 deaths
British colonial army soldiers
British Kenya people
British military personnel killed in World War II
East African campaign (World War II)
World War II recipients of the Victoria Cross
Nigel
People educated at Bromsgrove School
People from Nyeri County